The restricted shell is a Unix shell that restricts some of the capabilities available to an interactive user session, or to a shell script, running within it.  It is intended to provide an additional layer of security, but is insufficient to allow execution of entirely untrusted software.  A restricted mode operation is found in the original Bourne shell and its later counterpart , and in the KornShell.  In some cases a restricted shell is used in conjunction with a chroot jail, in a further attempt to limit access to the system as a whole.

Invocation
The restricted mode of the Bourne shell , and its POSIX workalikes, is used when the interpreter is invoked in one of the following ways:
      note that this conflicts with the "read" option in some  variants 
     note that this may conflict with the remote shell command, which is also called  on some systems

The restricted mode of Bash is used when Bash is invoked in one of the following ways:
 
 
 

Similarly KornShell's restricted mode is produced by invoking it thus:

Setting up rbash

For some systems (e.g., CentOS), the invocation through  is not enabled by default, and the user obtains a  error if invoked directly, or a login failure if the /etc/passwd file indicates  as the user's shell.

This can be accomplished with the following simple commands (executed as root, either logged in as user root, or using sudo):
root@host:~# cd /bin
root@host:/bin# ln bash rbash

Limited operations
The following operations are not permitted in a restricted shell:

 changing directory
 specifying absolute pathnames or names containing a slash
 setting the PATH or SHELL variable
 redirection of output

Bash adds further restrictions, including:
 limitations on function definitions
 limitations on the use of slash-ed filenames in Bash builtins

Restrictions in the restricted KornShell are much the same as those in the restricted Bourne shell.

Weaknesses of a restricted shell
The restricted shell is not secure. A user can break out of the restricted environment by running a program that features a shell function. The following is an example of the shell function in vi being used to escape from the restricted shell:
user@host:~$ vi
:set shell=/bin/sh
:shell
user@host:~$ rbash
user@host:~$ cd /
rbash: cd: restricted
user@host:~$ bash
user@host:~$ cd /
user@host:/$

List of programs 
Beyond the restricted modes of usual shells, specialized restricted shell programs include:
 rssh – used with OpenSSH, permitting only certain file copying programs, namely scp, sftp, rsync, cvs, and rdist
 smrsh, which limits the commands sendmail can invoke

See also 
 Remote Shell

References

Command shells